Dimitar Kumchev (born April 20, 1980) is a Bulgarian freestyle wrestler. He competed in the men's freestyle 125 kg event at the 2016 Summer Olympics, in which he was eliminated in the round of 32 by Geno Petriashvili.

References

External links
 

1980 births
Living people
Bulgarian male sport wrestlers
Olympic wrestlers of Bulgaria
Wrestlers at the 2016 Summer Olympics